Athenaeum Illustre, or Amsterdamse Atheneum, was a city-sponsored 'illustrious school' founded after the beeldenstorm in the old Agnieten chapel on the Oudezijds Voorburgwal 231 in Amsterdam, Netherlands. Famous scientists such as Caspar Barlaeus, Gerardus Vossius, and Petrus Camper taught here.

History

The chapel is all that remains of the Agnietenklooster built in 1470, that was illustrated by Cornelis Anthonisz in 1544. It was remodelled in 1631 to become the Atheneaeum Illustre, which was the same year the old gate from 1571 was moved.
Though it is considered the predecessor to the University of Amsterdam, it was not possible to earn a degree there and it wasn't lawfully recognized for diplomas until 1815. It wasn't until 1877 that it was recognized for doctorates, and that was the same year the name was changed to Gemeentelijke Universiteit van Amsterdam. Professors were appointed by the city council and the mayor of Amsterdam was chairman of the board. This situation remained in place until 1961, when the financial responsibility for the school reverted to the national ministry of education.

At the foundation of the Athenaeum Illustre, the City Library was moved to the attics of the Agnietenkapel and thus formed the origin of the present University Library.

References

 Athenaeum Illustre is window number 15 of the Canon of Amsterdam, by Piet de Rooy & Emma Los, Uitgeverij Boom, Amsterdam, 2008, 

17th century in Amsterdam
Schools in Amsterdam
University of Amsterdam
Rijksmonuments in Amsterdam